Pepper and salt may refer to:
Salt and pepper
Pepper and Salt, or Seasoning for Young Folk, a book of traditional tales for young readers by Howard Pyle
Pepper …  And Salt, a political cartoon featured regularly in The Wall Street Journal
Erigenia bulbosa, a plant native to the eastern United States
Philotheca spicata, a plant native to Western Australia